Lempaala may refer to:
Lempäälä, a municipality in Finland
Lempaala, Finnish name of Lembolovo, a rural locality in Russia